The first Philippe government (French: Gouvernement Édouard Philippe I) was the fortieth government of the French Fifth Republic. It was the first government formed by Édouard Philippe under President Emmanuel Macron, prior to the 2017 legislative election.

Context of formation 
On 15 May 2017, Édouard Philippe was appointed as Prime Minister by President Emmanuel Macron.

Composition

Initial 

Deputy Ministers

Secretaries of State

Gallery

Prime Minister

Ministers of State

Ministers

Deputy Ministers

Secretaries of State

References

External links 
Official announcement

French governments
Cabinets established in 2017
Emmanuel Macron